Louis-François Archambault (30 March 1742, Paris - 5 January 1812, Paris), stage name Dorvigny, was a French novelist, actor and playwright, and the inventor of "janotism" (gross errors of language for comic effect).

Said to be an illegitimate son of Louis XV of France, he began his acting career under Nicolet and put on plays at the Théâtre des Variétés-Amusantes, the Théâtre de l'Ambigu-Comique, the Grands-Danseurs du Roi, the Théâtre des Délassements-Comiques and the Théâtre des Associés.

Works 
Theatre

 À bon chat, bon rat, comédie-proverbe (text online)
 Aujourd'hui, ou Roger Bontemps, comedy in one act and in prose, Paris, Théâtre de l'Ambigu-Comique, 15 June 1782
 Bernique, ou le Tyran comique, parody in 3 acts and in verse, Théâtre de l'Ambigu-Comique, 21 August 1787
 Blaise le hargneux, comedy in one act and in prose, Théâtre des Grands-Danseurs du Roi, 17 November 1782
 Cà n'en est pas, proverbe
 Carmagnole et Guillot Gorju, tragédie pour rire
 Chacun son métier, les champs sont bien gardés, proverbe
 Christophe le Rond, comedy in one act and in prose
 Hurlubrelu ou Tout de travers, comedy in one act and in prose
 Janot chez le dégraisseur ou A quelque chose malheur est bon, proverbe, Théâtre des Variétés-Amusantes, 18 October 1779 (text online)
 Janot ou les Battus payent l'amende, comedy proverbe in one act
 Jocrisse au bal de l'Opéra, folie in two acts
 Jocrisse congédié, folie in two acts
 La Corbeille enchantée ou le Pays des chimères, comedy avec spectacle and divertissemens
 La Fête de campagne ou l'intendant comédien malgré lui, one-act comedy épisodique, in prose and in verse
 La Méprise innocente, comedy in one acte and in prose, Paris, Théâtre de l'Ambigu-Comique, 31 October 1791
 La Rage d'amour, parody of Roland in one act and in verse, mingled with vaudevilles and ariettes, Théâtre de l'Hôtel de Bourgogne, 19 March 1778
 L'Avocat chansonnier, ou Qui compte sans son hôte compte deux fois, comédie-proverbe, Théâtre des Variétés-Amusantes, 18 August 1779
 Le Brave Homme, comedy in one act and in prose, Théâtre des Élèves pour la danse de l'Opéra, 24 April 1779
 Le Désespoir de Jocrisse, comédie-folie in two acts and in prose, Théâtre Montansier, 22 November 1791 (text online)
 Le Mai, one-act comedy
 Le Nègre blanc, comedy in one act and in prose, Théâtre des Variétés-Amusantes, 28 June 1780
 Le Niais de Sologne ou Il n'est pas si bête qu'il en a l'air, comedy in one act in prose
 Le Sultan généreux, three-act comedy in verse, Théâtre de l'Ambigu-Comique, 10 May 1784
 L'Emménagement de la folie, one-act comedy
 Les Battus paient l'amende ou Ce que l'on voudra, proverbe-comédie-parade
 Les Bons Amis ou Il était temps, parodie d'Iphigénie en Tauride, in one act and in verse, comédie-proverbe, Théâtre des Variétés-Amusantes, 2 July 1779
 Les Désespérés ou le Projet anglais, comedy in one act and in prose
 Les Étrennes de l'amitié, de l'amour et de la nature, comedy in one acte, in verse
 Les Fausses consultations, one-act comedy in prose
 Les Folies à la mode, one-act comedy
 Les Réclamations contre l'emprunt forcé, one-act comedy, Théâtre d'Émulation, 9 January 1796 (text online)
 Les Suisses de Châteauvieux, two-act historical play in prose, Théâtre Molière, 5 December 1791
 L'Hospitalité ou le Bonheur du vieux père, opéra comique in one act and in vaudevilles, mingled with Italian music
 L'Intendant comédien malgré lui, comédie épisodique
 Ni l'un ni l'autre, one-act comedy
 On fait ce qu'on peut et non pas ce qu'on veut, comédie-proverbe with two actors
 Oui ou non, one-act comedy in prose
 Qui court deux lièvres n'en prend aucun, comedy in prose, Théâtre des Grands-Danseurs du Roi, 30 November 1782
 Raimonde, ou Laissez chacun comme il est, one-act play in prose, Théâtre des Grands-Danseurs du Roi, 10 October 1782

Novels
 Mystifications d'Innocentin Poulot, petit-fils de M. de Pouceaugnac
 Nouveau Roman comique
 Ma tante Geneviève ou je l'ai échappé belle
 Madelon Friquet et Colin Tampon ou les Amants du Faubourg Saint-Martin
 Le Ménage diabolique
 La Femme à projets
 Madame Botte
 Les Caprices et bizarreries de la nature
 Les Quatre cousins
 Les Mille et un guignons

External links 
 Dorvigny on 
 Dorvigny on Encyclopedia Universalis

1742 births
1812 deaths
Male actors from Paris
18th-century French novelists
19th-century French novelists
18th-century French male actors
French male stage actors
18th-century French dramatists and playwrights